Choksi is a Gujarati surname. Notable people with the surname include:

Ashwin Choksi (1944–2018), Indian entrepreneur
Mehul Choksi (born 1959), Indian businessman
Mukul Choksi (born 1959), Gujarati poet 

Indian surnames